Yuan Zheng (born 18 January 1997) is a Chinese footballer currently playing as a midfielder for Gondomar.

Club career
Born and raised in Nanjing, Yuan played for the Jiangsu regional team, before briefly joining Jiangsu Suning. He played professionally for Nanjing Shaye in the 2019 season, and had also represented the team the year before in the Chinese Champions League.

Career statistics

Club
.

Notes

References

1997 births
Living people
Sportspeople from Nanjing
Chinese footballers
Association football midfielders
China League Two players
Jiangsu F.C. players
Gondomar S.C. players
Chinese expatriate footballers
Chinese expatriate sportspeople in Portugal
Expatriate footballers in Portugal